Canadian cartoons may refer to:

Canadian animation
Canadian comics and cartooning